The Rover 1S60 is a gas turbine manufactured by Rover Company and the first industrial type for production Many were used for aircraft such as Auxiliary power units for groundcrew and Auxiliary Airborne Power Plants on aircraft. Other uses of the Rover 1S60 was used as fire pumps and Auxiliary generators on hovercraft.

Applications
AAPP MK10201 Argosy
AAPP MK 10301 Avro Vulcan
1S60 fire pump

Specifications (1S60)

See also
List of aircraft engines

References

External links
Rover 1S60 promotional video
Rover Gas Turbines

Aircraft auxiliary power units
Rover engines
Gas turbines
Centrifugal-flow turbojet engines